Silvinichthys is a genus of fish in the family Trichomycteridae endemic to Argentina.

Species
There are currently 7 recognized species in this genus:
 Silvinichthys bortayro L. A. Fernández & de Pinna, 2005
 Silvinichthys gualcamayo L. A. Fernández, Sanabria & Quiroga, 2013 
 Silvinichthys huachi L. A. Fernández, Sanabria, Quiroga & Vari, 2014 
 Silvinichthys leoncitensis L. A. Fernández, Dominino, Brancolini & Baigún, 2011 
 Silvinichthys mendozensis (Arratia, Chang G., Menu-Marque & Rojas M., 1978)
 Silvinichthys pachonensis L. A. Fernández & Liotta, 2016 
 Silvinichthys pedernalensis L. A. Fernández, Sanabria & Quiroga, 2017

References

Catfish genera
Fish of Argentina
Freshwater fish genera
Trichomycteridae